Betula michauxii, the Newfoundland dwarf birch, is a species of birch which is native to Newfoundland, Nova Scotia and Quebec as well as Saint Pierre and Miquelon. It is a perennial herb.

Description
The leaves are obovate and have a glabrous surface. The fruits ripen by fall and are as glabrous as the leaves. Its habitats include sphagnum bogs, around pools, and wet peaty meadows.

References

Further reading

michauxii
Flora of Labrador
Flora of Newfoundland
Flora of Nova Scotia
Flora of Quebec
Flora of Eastern Canada
Flora of Saint Pierre and Miquelon